Rho GTPase-activating protein 19 is an enzyme that in humans is encoded by the ARHGAP19 gene.

References

External links

Further reading